Hon. Thomas Watson, later known as Thomas Watson-Wentworth (17 June 1665 – 6 October 1723), of Wentworth Woodhouse in Yorkshire, was an English landowner and politician who sat in the House of Commons between 1701 and 1723.

Origins
He was the third son of Edward Watson, 2nd Baron Rockingham (1630-1689) by his wife Anne Wentworth, only daughter of Thomas Wentworth, 1st Earl of Strafford (1593-1641) and heiress 
of her childless brother William Wentworth, 2nd Earl of Strafford (1626-1695) of Wentworth Woodhouse. His eldest brother was Lewis Watson, 1st Earl of Rockingham, 3rd Baron Rockingham (1655-1724), who in 1714 was created Earl of Rockingham.

Early life
He matriculated  at Christ Church, Oxford in 1683.

Marriage and children
By licence dated 18 July 1689 he married Alice Proby, a daughter and heiress of Sir Thomas Proby, 1st Baronet, by whom he had children including:
Thomas Watson-Wentworth, 1st Marquess of Rockingham (13 November 1693 – 14 December 1750), KB, Privy Council of Ireland, a Whig politician who in 1725 rebuilt Wentworth Woodhouse as the palatial building surviving today.

Wentworth inheritance

In 1695 Watson inherited the fortune of his maternal uncle William Wentworth, 2nd Earl of Strafford, including the vast estate of Wentworth Woodhouse in Yorkshire, with others in Northamptonshire and Ireland. This was in preference to the Earl's  first cousin once-removed Thomas Wentworth (later created Earl of Strafford), who shared with him common ancestry in the male line, and it led to a fierce rivalry between the two men and their families. In accordance with the terms of the bequest, Watson adopted the additional surname of Wentworth, becoming Thomas Watson-Wentworth.

Career
Watson-Wentworth was returned unopposed as Whig Member of Parliament for Bossiney at a by-election on 21 March 1701. He was only returned as a stop-gap and at the general election later that year he sought a seat elsewhere but in the end decided not to stand.  At the 1702 general election, he stood at Higham Ferrers but was defeated. However his opponent died within a year and Watson-Wentworth was returned unopposed for Higham Ferrers at a by-election on 22 November 1703. He acquired the electoral interest at Higham Ferrers and was returned unopposed at the general elections of 1705, 1708 and 1710. He made little impression in his first parliaments, but being a church supporter moved progressively towards the Tories culminating in opposing the impeachment of Dr Sacheverell and being considered a worthy patriot. At the 1713 general election he was returned at Malton as well as Higham Ferrers and decided to sit for Malton. Now being considered whimsical or a Whig that voted with the Tories he supported the Whigs against the expulsion of Richard Steele and in other divisions. After the 1715 general election, when he and his son were elected in a contest at Malton, he was classified as a Whig, but voted against the government on almost every occasion. At the 1722 general election he was returned unopposed again for Higham Ferrers.

Death and burial
Watson-Wentworth died at Harrowden on 6 October 1723 and was buried in York Minster where his elaborate monument with standing marble effigy survives. It was sculpted by Giovanni Battista Guelphi.

References

1665 births
1723 deaths
Members of the Parliament of Great Britain for English constituencies
British MPs 1713–1715
British MPs 1715–1722
British MPs 1722–1727